The 1939–40 season was the 13th season of competitive football in the British Mandate for Palestine under the Eretz Israel Football Association.

IFA Competitions

1939 Palestine League

Matches of the 1939 Palestine League, which, due to the Arab Revolt, was split into regional leagues, rather than holding a national championship, were carried from the previous season , and were finished in fall 1939. Maccabi Tel Aviv and British Police won the Tel Aviv and Jerusalem divisions of top tier Liga Alef, while Hapoel Hadera, Beitar Tel Aviv and Maccabi Rehovot won their Liga Bet regional divisions.

1940 Palestine League

Shortly after the conclusion of the previous league season, a new league season was held, starting on 3 February 1940. League matches were completed in early July 1940, with Hapoel Tel Aviv winning the championship.

League table

Liga Bet
In Liga Bet, Hapoel Hadera, Degel Zion Tel Aviv and RSG Rehovot won their regional divisions. 
At the end of the season, Degel Zion, Hapoel Hadera and Hapoel Rishon LeZion (who finished as runners-up in the South division) competed for promotions to the top division, with Hapoel Rishon LeZion and Degel Zion winning promotion.

Liga Gimel
For the first time the EIFA arranged a third division, which was divided into two regions, Samaria (North) and South. Among the teams participating in the league were future league champions Bnei Yehuda and Hapoel Kfar Saba, both making their debut in the league.

Only a handful of results are known. Maccabi Kfar Saba and Hakoach Rishon LeZion won the Samaria and South divisions and qualified along with their runners-up, Hapoel Kfar Saba and HaMa'avir Tel Aviv to the promotion play-offs, at the end which the top three teams were promoted to Liga Bet. However, as club registration for the following season was low, all third division clubs that registered to play were placed in Liga Bet.

1940 Palestine Cup

Hapoel Tel Aviv, the defending cup holders were beaten by local rivals Maccabi Tel Aviv 0–4 in the semi-finals. In the final, Maccabi were beaten 1–3 by Beitar Tel Aviv.

Jerusalem League
A five-team league was played in Jerusalem during spring 1940, with each team playing its opponents twice. Maccabi Bar Kochva Jerusalem won the league.

National team
The national Eretz Israel team hosted the Lebanese national team in a friendly match, Lebanon's first official international, which was played on 27 April 1940.

Notable Events
 On 9 December 1939, Maccabi Nes Tziona had beaten Maccabi Tel Aviv in a match for the Melchett Cup 2–1. In the match, held at the Maccabiah Stadium, The brothers Schneiderowitz scored the two goals for Nes Tziona on the 47th and 64th minute, while Gaul Machlis scored the only goal for Tel Aviv on the 61st minute.

References